Hawke's Bay primarily refers to a region on the east coast of New Zealand's North Island.

Hawke's Bay may refer to:

 Canada
 Hawke's Bay, Newfoundland and Labrador, Canada
 New Zealand
 Hawke Bay, a bay on the east coast of North Island
 Hawkes Bay (New Zealand electorate), an electorate (1881–1996) until 1986 spelled Hawke's Bay
 Hawke's Bay Province, a province of New Zealand until 1876
 Pakistan
 a bay on the Arabian Sea, west of Karachi, south of Kiamari Town
 Hawke's Bay Beach
 Hawke's Bay Town, Karachi, Sindh, Pakistan

See also 
 Hawke's Bay cricket team
 Hawke's Bay Guineas
 Hawke's Bay Hawks
 Hawke's Bay Rugby Union
 Hawke's Bay Today
 Hawke's Bay Unicorns
 Hawke's Bay United